Lovemaker or variants may refer to:

Lovemaker (it), 1969 film with Antonio Sabàto Sr.
The Lovemakers (film), 1961 Italian film
The Lovemakers (band)